Eurodachtha pallicornella is a moth in the family Lecithoceridae. It was described by Staudinger in 1859. It is found in France and on the Iberian Peninsula.

The wingspan is about 15 mm. The forewings are glossy dark brown in males and light brownish-yellow in females.

References

Moths described in 1859
Eurodachtha